Arene echinacantha is a species of sea snail, a marine gastropod mollusk in the family Areneidae.

Description

The shell can grow to be 8 mm in length.

Distribution
Arene echinacantha can be found in the Red Sea and the Northwest Indian Ocean.

References

External links
 To World Register of Marine Species

Areneidae
Gastropods described in 1903